Balthasar or Balthazar Bellerus or Bellère (active 1589–1634) was a printer first at Antwerp and later at Douai in the Habsburg Netherlands. He was a son of the reputable Antwerp printer Joannes Bellerus, and set up a printing shop of his own in the Rue des Ecoles in Douai in 1590, becoming a colleague and rival to Jan Bogard. The motto that appeared on his printer's mark was Labore ac perseverantiâ (Work and perseverance). His marks were the golden compass and a unicorn dipping its horn in a stream. 

On 15 November 1638, Balthasar Moretus wrote to Bellerus asking him to provide an apprenticeship for Martin Nutius, oldest son of the recently deceased Anwerp printer Martinus Nutius III. On 23 November Bellerus declined, predicting that there would be no future for the boy in Antwerp's shrinking book trade.

Works
 1596: Pedro de Ribadeneira, La vie du père François de Borja, translated by Michel d'Esne
 1597
 Nicolas de Montmorency, Manuale principes
 Iacobus de Vitriaco, Libri duo quorum prior orientalis, sive Hierosolymitanae: alter occidentalis historiae nomine inscribitur
 1605: Floris Van der Haer, Antiquitatum liturgicarum arcana, 2 volumes
 1608: John Brugman, La vie de la très Saincte et vrayment admirable vierge Ludyvine, translated by Michel d'Esne
 1612: Philibert Monet, Delectus latinitatis
 1614: Guilielmus Estius, In Omnes Divi Pauli Apostoli Epistolas Commentariorum Tomus Prior
 1617: Biblia Sacra in six volumes with the Glossa Ordinaria and the postils of Nicholas of Lyra
 1618: François-Hyacinthe Choquet, Sancti Belgii ordinis Praedicatorum
 1623: François-Hyacinthe Choquet, De confessione per literas, seu Internuncium, dissertationes theologicae
 1624: Vincentius Bellovacensis, Speculum naturale, in 4 volumes
 1629: François-Hyacinthe Choquet, Actions mémorables des PP. Dominicains qui ont fleuri aux Pays-Bas, translated by Jean de Noeuwirelle

Further reading
 Albert Labarre, "Les Catalogues de Balthasar Bellère à Douai, 1598–1636", Gutenberg-Jahrbuch, 55 (1980), pp. 150–154.
 H. Vanhulst, "Balthasar Bellère, marchand de musique à Douai (1603–1636)", Revue de musicologie, 85 (1999), pp. 227–263.

References

16th-century births
1630s deaths
Businesspeople from Antwerp
People from Douai
16th-century printers
17th-century printers
16th-century publishers (people)
17th-century publishers (people)
Book publishers (people) of the Habsburg Netherlands